Several ships of the Brazilian Navy have borne the name Pará

 , a  launched in 1867 and discarded in 1884
 , a 
  (pennant number D27), the former American  USS Albert David (FF-1050); acquired by the Brazilian Navy in 1989 and classed as a destroyer; decommissioned in 2008 and in reserve

Brazilian Navy ship names